Iuliia Galimullina (born 20 September 2001) is a Russian professional racing cyclist, who currently rides for UCI Women's Continental Team . In October 2020, she rode in the women's edition of the 2020 Liège–Bastogne–Liège race in Belgium.

References

External links

2001 births
Living people
Russian female cyclists
Place of birth missing (living people)